Clifford Portwood (17 October 1937 – 10 January 2012) was an English footballer and later singer and television personality.

A winger and inside-forward, he scored 96 goals in 252 league games in a fourteen-year career in the Football League. He spent 1955 to 1959 at Preston North End, without making an appearance, before he was sold on to Port Vale for £750. He was sold on to Grimsby Town for £6,000 in July 1961, and helped the club to win promotion out of the Third Division in 1961–62. He moved on to Portsmouth for £4,000 in 1963, where he remained for the next six years, before he left the professional game to move to South Africa. He later became a successful singer and television personality in Australia.

Playing career
Portwood started his career with Manchester Athletic, playing youth football with the likes of Bobby Charlton, Eddie Colman and Albert Scanlon, before joining Preston North End in February 1955 after being spotted by Frank Hill. During his time at Deepdale he was Tom Finney's understudy. However, he did not make his league debut at Preston, as new manager Cliff Britton did not see Portwood as being up to First Division standard once he returned from his national service with the Royal Air Force.

He joined Third Division Port Vale in August 1959, when manager Norman Low paid out £750 to secure his services. He scored his first senior goal against Queens Park Rangers on 5 December 1959, in a 3–3 draw in the FA Cup. He finished the 1959–60 campaign with 12 goals to his name, bagging braces in wins over Grimsby Town and Bury. He was the club's top scorer for the 1960–61 season with 26 goals, netting twice in clashes with Chelmsford City, Watford, Bristol City and Grimsby Town, and hitting a hat-trick in a 5–0 boxing day win over Tranmere Rovers in front of over 14,000 spectators at Vale Park. He was sold to Grimsby Town for £6,000 in July 1961, as the club were looking to raise £10,000 to re-sign Stan Steele from West Bromwich Albion. He had scored 38 goals in 74 games for Port Vale in league and cup competitions.

Under Tim Ward's stewardship, the "Mariners" won promotion out of the Third Division as runners-up in 1961–62, finishing three points ahead of third-placed Bournemouth & Boscombe Athletic. They retained their Second Division status by a four-point margin in 1962–63, after which new manager Tom Johnston moved Portwood on to George Smith's Portsmouth for a £4,000 fee, also in the second tier. He had scored 35 goals in 92 league games for Grimsby in a two-year spell.

Legendary striker Ron Saunders left the club in 1964, after scoring 33 goals in 1963–64. This left Portsmouth short of goals, and Portwood was the club's top scorer in the 1964–65 season with 12 goals, helping them to avoid relegation by just one point. Portwood scored a total of 30 goals in 106 league and cup games at Portsmouth. After leaving "Pompey" in 1969 he went to South Africa, playing and coaching with Durban United. Whilst in Durban, he entered a singing competition on the radio and won a recording contract in Australia.

Style of play
In his later life, Portwood compared his style to that of Cristiano Ronaldo – "on the ball, twinkly-toed, turn on a sixpence, turn in the box, sharp."

Singing career
Moving to Melbourne permanently in the early 1970s, he became a successful recording artist and TV personality, earning five gold records and appearing on Channel 7's The Penthouse Club most weekends. During his career he met and performed with such people as Keith Moon, Bernard Cribbins, Tommy Cooper, Frankie Vaughan and Dick Emery. Portwood returned to England in the early 1980s, on his return he appeared on several talent shows and in 1982 recorded a World Cup song with members of the 1966 FIFA World Cup squad; "Up there oh England" was pulled due to a licensing issue on the B-side. The song was done in conjunction with his producer friend, Mike Brady, who wrote the original song "Up There Cazaly", a number one in Australia. The licensing issue was eventually resolved in time for the 2010 FIFA World Cup.

In the late 1990s he had for several years been going to Florida and successfully singing on the cabaret circuit there in the winter months, until a lung condition meant he had to return full-time to England in 2008. There he regularly watched Portsmouth play at Fratton Park, and lived in Alton, Hampshire, until his death. He died in hospital at Basingstoke on 10 January 2012, after losing his battle with lung disease.

Career statistics
Source:

Honours
Grimsby Town
Football League Third Division second-place promotion: 1961–62

References

1937 births
2012 deaths
Footballers from Salford
English footballers
Association football wingers
Association football forwards
Preston North End F.C. players
Port Vale F.C. players
Grimsby Town F.C. players
Portsmouth F.C. players
Durban United F.C. players
English Football League players
English expatriate footballers
Expatriate soccer players in South Africa
English expatriate sportspeople in South Africa
English expatriate sportspeople in Australia
Association football coaches
English male singers
Deaths from lung disease